The Copa Chile 1958 was the 1st edition of the Chilean Cup tournament. The competition started on November 5, 1958 and concluded on December 20, 1958. Colo-Colo won the competition by goal average over the entire tournament, after drawing with Universidad Católica on the final.

Matches were scheduled to be played at the stadium of the team named first on the date specified for each round.

Calendar

First round

Second round

Quarterfinals

Semifinals

Third-place match

Final

Colo-Colo won by average goal over the tournament; GF:27, GA:9, 3.0 goal average; U. Católica GF:21, GA:8, 2.63 goal average

Top goalscorers
 Adolfo Godoy (Universidad Católica) 7 goals
 Máximo Rolón (Everton) 7 goals

See also
 1958 Campeonato Nacional
 Primera B

References
Revista Estadio (Santiago, Chile) November, December 1958 (revised scores & information)
RSSSF (secondary source, some mistakes in it)

Copa Chile
Chil
1958
Football competitions in Chile